The 2006 North Texas Mean Green football team represented the University of North Texas (UNT) during the 2006 NCAA Division I FBS football season. The Mean Green played their home games at Fouts Field in Denton, Texas, competing in the Sun Belt Conference. The team was led by Darrell Dickey in his ninth and final season as the program's head coach, finishing with an overall record of 3–9, going 2–5 in conference play, finishing in 7th place in the Sun Belt.

Following the season, Dickey was fired. He finished at UNT with an overall record of 42–64.

Schedule

Game summaries

Texas

SMU

Tulsa

Akron

Middle Tennessee

Florida International

The Mean Green's contest with the Florida International Golden Panthers lasted seven overtime periods before North Texas kicker Denis Hopovac made his fifth field goal of the night to bring the team ahead 25–22. Hopovac's nine attempts tied an NCAA FBS record for field goal attempts in a game. Hopovac and FIU kicker Dustin Rivest combined for eight missed field goals.

Arkansas State

Troy

Louisiana Tech

Louisiana-Lafayette

Florida Atlantic

Louisiana-Monroe

References

North Texas
North Texas Mean Green football seasons
North Texas Mean Green football